Geoffrey Cormack (born 26 February 1929) is an Australian former cricketer. He played five first-class cricket matches for Victoria between 1952 and 1954.

See also
 List of Victoria first-class cricketers

References

External links
 

1929 births
Possibly living people
Australian cricketers
Victoria cricketers
Cricketers from Melbourne